Festuca dolichophylla is a species of grass which is endemic to western South America with an occurrence in Costa Rica.

Description

They also have scaberulous, hairy, and smooth surface which is ribbed a swell.

Spikelets are solitary with pedicelled fertile spikelets that carry 5–7 fertile florets. The glumes are chartaceous and keelless, have acute apexes, with only difference is in size.

Lemma itself is muticous with acuminate apex, scaberulous surface and carries one awn.

Flowers have three stamens while the fruits are caryopses with an additional pericarp and linear hilum.

References

dolichophylla
Bunchgrasses of South America
Flora of western South America
Flora of Costa Rica